Nomadinae is a subfamily of bees in the family Apidae. They are known commonly as cuckoo bees.

This subfamily is entirely kleptoparasitic. They occur worldwide, and use many different types of bees as hosts. As parasites, they lack a pollen-carrying scopa, and are often extraordinarily wasp-like in appearance. All known species share the behavioral trait of females entering host nests when the host is absent, and inserting their eggs into the wall of the host cell; the larval parasite emerges later, after the cell has been closed by the host female, and kills the host larva. The first-instar larvae of nomadines are specially adapted for this, and possess long mandibles they use to kill the host larva, though these mandibles are lost as soon as the larva molts to the second instar, at which point it simply feeds on the pollen/nectar provisions. A behavioral habit shared by adults of various genera with males of many other bee species, who also do not possess a nest to return to, is  that they frequently rest while grasping onto plant stems or leaves with only their mandibles.

Systematics
Tribes and genera include:
Tribe Hexepeolini
Hexepeolus
Tribe Brachynomadini
Brachynomada
Kelita
Paranomada
Trichonomada
Triopasites
Tribe Nomadini
Nomada
Tribe Epeolini
Doeringiella
Epeolus
Odyneropsis
Pseudepeolus
Rhinepeolus
Rhogepeolus
Thalestria
Triepeolus
Tribe Ammobatoidini
Aethammobates
Ammobatoides
Holcopasites
Schmiedeknechtia
Tribe Biastini
Biastes
Neopasites
Rhopalolemma
Tribe Townsendiellini
Townsendiella
Tribe Neolarrini
Neolarra
Tribe Ammobatini
Ammobates
Chiasmognathus 
Melanempis
Oreopasites
Parammobatodes
Pasites
Sphecodopsis
Spinopasites
Tribe Caenoprosopidini
Caenoprosopina
Caenoprosopis

Notes

References
Michener, C. D. (2000). The Bees of the World, Johns Hopkins University Press.

 
Brood parasites
Bee subfamilies